General Myat Hein is a Burmese politician and former military official who served as the Minister for Communications and Information Technology from 2013 to 2015 and commander-in-chief of the Myanmar Air Force. He has served as Vice Chairman of the Union Solidarity and Development Party since August 2016.

Early life and education
Myat Hein was born on 27 April 1955 in Pegu, Pegu Division, Burma. He earned a master's degree from the Defence Services Academy.

Military and governmental career
During 2001, Myat Hein held the rank of colonel and served as Chief of Staff (Air). The following year, Myat Hein remained as Chief of Staff (Air), and was promoted to brigadier general. By 2003 he had been appointed Commander-in-Chief (Air) and held the rank of major general. During his time as the Air Force commander, Myat Hein has maintained close links with China and India.

On 13 February 2013, he retired from the military and became Minister of Communications and Information Technology. The European Union has ordered that Myat Hein's funds be frozen inside its jurisdiction.

On 23 August 2016, he was elected Vice-Chairman of the Union Solidarity and Development Party, preceded by three deputy-chairman Shwe Mann, Htay Oo and Aye Myint, replacing former president Thein Sein.

Personal life
Myat Hain is married to Htwe Htwe Nyunt.

References 

|-

Burmese generals
Air force generals
Living people
Defence Services Academy alumni
People from Bago Region
1955 births
Burmese military personnel
Government ministers of Myanmar
Union Solidarity and Development Party politicians